Frank Bowcher Wright (11 October 1807 – 5 August 1891) was an English cleric, and a cricketer. He was associated with Oxford University Cricket Club and made his first-class cricket debut in 1829.

Wright was educated at The Queen's College, Oxford, matriculating in 1827, and graduating B.A. in 1832.. He then became a Church of England priest and was rector of St John's, Higher Broughton, for 42 years from 1849 until his death. Frank Wynyard Wright was his son.

References

1807 births
1891 deaths
English cricketers
English cricketers of 1826 to 1863
Oxford University cricketers
Alumni of The Queen's College, Oxford
19th-century English Anglican priests